WOFDM may refer to:
 Wideband-OFDM
 Wavelet-OFDM